Sigaus australis is the most common alpine grasshopper found in New Zealand. It can be found in the southern half of the South Island above the tree line. Sigaus australis was described in 1897 by Frederick Hutton. Like all of New Zealand sub-alpine and alpine grasshoppers S. australis has a 2 or 3 years life cycle. Individuals can survive the cold by freezing solid at any life stage, at any time of the year. Sigaus australis adults are relatively large grasshoppers (females ~ 26mm, 0.8g). The genus Sigaus is endemic to New Zealand.

Distribution and habitat
 
Sigaus australis can be found in the southern half of the South Island, from Otago and Canterbury regions. It can be found as far south as the Takitimu Mountains and as far north as the Torless Range. Evidence from mtDNA sequencing suggests that S. australis encompasses several narrow endemic taxa and one widespread species.Sigaus australis would have been more widespread during the last glacial period with both morphological and genetic signature of greater population connectivity in the past. With climate warming and low dispersal potential, S. australis will probably lose 75% to 93% of its suitable habitat by 2070.

Species description
The wings on S. australis are micropterous (small wings) between  making this species flightless like most of New Zealand grasshoppers. Sigaus australis is highly cryptic, with colour polymorphism. They will match the surrounding vegetation with colours of green and earth tones.

Type Information
Paprides australis Hutton (1897:147)
Hutton, F.W. 1897: The grasshopper and locusts of New Zealand and the Kermadec Island. Proc. Trans. NZ Inst. 30: 135-50
Type locality: Probably from Glenorchy, Lake Wakatipu, Otago. .
Type specimen: Female; C Chilton; Holotype and Lectotype are deposited in the Canterbury Museum, Christchurch.

Paprides torquatus Hutton (1898:47)
Hutton, F.W. 1898: Notes on the New Zealand. Proc. Trans. NZ Inst. 31: 44-50
Type locality: Probably from Mount Torlesse, Canterbury. .
Type specimen: Male; Holotype deposited in the Canterbury Museum, Christchurch.

Paprides armillaus Hutton (1898:47-48)
Hutton, F.W. 1898: Notes on the New Zealand. Proc. Trans. NZ Inst. 31: 44-50

References

Acrididae of New Zealand
Endemic fauna of New Zealand
Insects described in 1898
Acrididae
Endemic insects of New Zealand